Deer Creek Township is one of twenty-four townships in Bates County, Missouri, and is part of the Kansas City metropolitan area within the USA.  As of the 2000 census, its population was 2,162.

The township was named for a nearby creek of the same name where deer were abundant.

Geography
According to the United States Census Bureau, Deer Creek Township covers an area of 31.71 square miles (82.12 square kilometers); of this, 31.67 square miles (82.03 square kilometers, 99.89 percent) is land and 0.03 square miles (0.08 square kilometers, 0.1 percent) is water.

Cities, towns, villages
 Adrian (partial)

Unincorporated towns
 Coleville at 
 Crescent Hill at 
(This list is based on USGS data and may include former settlements.)

Adjacent townships
 Austin Township, Cass County (north)
 Grand River Township (east)
 Shawnee Township (southeast)
 Mound Township (south)
 Elkhart Township (southwest)
 East Boone Township (west)

Cemeteries
The township contains Crescent Hill Cemetery.

Major highways
  U.S. Route 71

Rivers
 South Grand River

School districts
 Adrian County R-III
 Cass County R-V

Political districts
 Missouri's 4th congressional district
 State House District 120
 State House District 125
 State Senate District 31

References
 United States Census Bureau 2008 TIGER/Line Shapefiles
 United States Board on Geographic Names (GNIS)
 United States National Atlas

External links
 US-Counties.com
 City-Data.com

Townships in Bates County, Missouri
Townships in Missouri